Donald or Don Walsh may refer to:

Donald Walsh (athlete), Irish distance runner
A. D. Walsh (known as Donald Walsh; 1916–1977), British chemist
E. Donald Walsh (1917–1997), American major general
Don Walsh (born 1931), American oceanographer, explorer and marine policy specialist
Don Walsh (basketball), American basketball player
Don Walsh (Canadian football) (1932–2006), Canadian football player
Don Walsh (footballer) (1934–2016), Australian rules footballer
Donnie Walsh (born 1941), basketball consultant